Ângela Sónia Monteiro Cardoso (born April 9, 1979) is a former Angolan basketball player. At the 2012 Summer Olympics, she competed for the Angola women's national basketball team in the women's event. She is 5 ft 11 inches tall.

References

External links
 

Angolan women's basketball players
1979 births
Living people
Olympic basketball players of Angola
Basketball players at the 2012 Summer Olympics
C.D. Primeiro de Agosto women's basketball players
G.D. Interclube women's basketball players
Power forwards (basketball)
African Games silver medalists for Angola
African Games medalists in basketball
Competitors at the 2007 All-Africa Games